Tras Street  is a street located in Tanjong Pagar in the Outram Planning Area and Downtown Core in Singapore. The road connects Enggor Street and Gopeng Street to Cook Street, and is intersected by Wallich Street.

Etymology and History
The street name Tras Street dates from an 1898 municipal resolution to "use names of rivers and districts in the Malay Peninsula as being better adapted to the purpose [of naming streets] than the names of persons or families". Other Malayan place names which were assigned in the same year to new streets laid out on either side of Anson Road near Tanjong Pagar included Bernam Road, Enggor Street and Raub Street.

Hong San See Temple
The Hong San See Temple, which means "Phoenix Hill Temple" in Hokkien, by migrants from Lam Ann County in Fujian Province. The temple used to be located at Tras Street when it was first built in 1836. A road widening project in 1907 involving government acquisition of the temple's site resulted in its relocation to Mohamed Sultan Road.

Tras Street Today
Tras Street today is lined with many shophouses, many of which are two- and three-storey buildings. These shophouses, some of which are conserved pre-war buildings, are home to shops, eating places, pubs, boutiques and offices. The street is in fact a well-known night spot because of its string of bars. Being part of the Tanjong Pagar Conservation area, and found within the historic district of Chinatown, there are efforts to bring back the old charms of Chinatown to Tras Street.

Alternate Names
The Chinese name for this street, Zu Shi Gong Kou (祖师公口). It is known as Chor Su Kong Kau in Hokkien, which means "mouth of the Chor Su Kong Temple". This name is very likely due to Kim Lan Temple (金兰庙) which is dedicated to Qing Shui Zhu Shi (清水祖师), also known as Chor Su Kong (祖师公) in Hokkien. Kim Lan Temple was founded in 1830, and is currently under the management of Hokkien Huay Kuan. The temple was formerly located at Narcis Street and moved to Kim Tian Road in 1988.  The former location of Kim Lan Temple at Narcis Street is actually very near Tras Street.

References

Victor R Savage, Brenda S A Yeoh (2004), Toponymics - A Study of Singapore Street Names, Eastern University Press, 
Dunlop, P. K. G. (2000). Street names of Singapore (p. 313). Singapore: Who's Who Publications.(Call no.: RSING 959.57 DUN)
Edwards, N., & Keys, P. (1996). Singapore: A guide to buildings, streets, places (p. 474). Singapore: Times Books International. (Call no.: RSING 959.57 EDW)
Samuel, D. S. (1991). Singapore's heritage: Through places of historical interest (p. 211). Singapore: Elixir Consultancy Service. (Call no.: RSING 959.57 SAM)
Savage, V. R., & Yeoh, B. S. A. (2003). Toponymics: A study of Singapore street names (p. 389). Singapore: Eastern Universities Press. (Call no.: RSING 915.9570014 SAV)
Firmstone, H. W. (1905, January). Chinese names of streets and places in Singapore and the Malay Peninsula. Journal of the Straits Branch of the Royal Asiatic Society, 4, 136, 137. (Call no.: RSING 959.5 FIR-[IC])
Rosemary Lim, (2008), An Irish Tour of Singapore, Two Trees Pte Ltd 
Rashiwala Kalpana. (1994, September 22). Goei group clinches half of shophouses at URA auction. The Straits Times, Money, p. 39.
James, Josephine. (2001, October 5). Work on oldest monastery completed. The Straits Times, p. 8.
Lum, M. (1999, May 12). The sweet Aroma of success. The Straits Times, Life, pp. 1–2.
Tras St shophouses attract bids of up to $1,502 psf. (1994, December 20). The Business Times, p. 2.
Chinatown, a treat for the senses. (1995, February 25). The Straits Times, Life, pp. 12–13.

Roads in Singapore
Downtown Core (Singapore)
Outram, Singapore